My Favourite Film was a television special broadcast on the ABC on 4 December 2005. After public voting took place on the show's website, the special listed the top ten most popular films as chosen by voters, and these films were discussed and their rankings debated by a panel hosted by Margaret Pomeranz, a long-time ABC film critic, which included Judith Lucy, Stuart MacGill, Sigrid Thornton, Chris Taylor, and Richard Roxburgh.

The Top Ten Films
The Lord of the Rings
Amélie
Blade Runner
The Shawshank Redemption
Donnie Darko
Star Wars
Pulp Fiction
The Princess Bride
Gone with the Wind
Fight Club

See also
My Favourite Album
My Favourite Australian
My Favourite Book

External links
 My Favourite Film website
 Top 100 films list

Australian television specials
Australian Broadcasting Corporation specials